Tyrone Gabriel Martin (born June 5, 1930) is a retired United States Navy commander, and a naval historian, most notable as an authority on  ("Old Ironsides"), of which he was the 58th commanding officer. Martin was born in Greenwich, Connecticut on 5 June 1930 and commissioned an officer through the NROTC in 1952. During his twenty-six years of navy service he commanded two destroyers on tours of duty off Korea and Vietnam finally becoming the commanding officer (captain) of Constitution on 6 August 1974. In July 1976, during the United States Bicentennial celebrations, Elizabeth II of the United Kingdom and Prince Philip, Duke of Edinburgh, arrived for their state visit and privately toured the ship for approximately thirty minutes with Commander Martin and Secretary of the Navy J. William Middendorf. During the 1980s, he was a Senior Naval Science Instructor (SNSI) for the NJROTC program at Boston Technical High School.

During Martin's tenure as Commanding Officer, several traditions were instituted that are still observed by the crew of Constitution such as the wearing of 1812 era uniforms and the practice of firing morning and sunset guns. Constitution received her first Meritorious Unit Commendation during his tour and Martin was the first Captain to be decorated for service since Charles Stewart. Martin turned over command of the ship to Commander Robert Leo Gillen on 30 June 1978. Now retired, Martin has written several books about "Old Ironsides", as well as numerous articles on various aspects of the ship and her times, plus the "Salty Talk" column in the journal Naval History.

In 2019, the Naval Historical Foundation awarded Martin the Commodore Dudley W. Knox Naval History Lifetime Achievement Award.

Works

References

American naval historians
American male non-fiction writers
United States Navy officers
Living people
1930 births